No Exit (French: Huis-clos) is a 1954 French drama film directed by Jacqueline Audry and starring Arletty, Gaby Sylvia and Franck Villard. It was adapted by Pierre Laroche and Jean-Paul Sartre from Sartre's stage play,

Cast 
 Arletty as Inès Serrano, a lesbian
 Gaby Sylvia as Estelle Rigaud, a murderer
 Franck Villard as Joseph Garcin, a good-for-nothing
 Yves Deniaud as le garçon d'étage (the Valet)
 Nicole Courcel as Olga, Estelle's best friend 
 Danièle Delorme as Florence, the lover of Inès
 Jean Debucourt as the general
 Jacques Chabassol as Pierre, a young man besotted with Estelle
 Arlette Thomas as Mme Garcin, Joseph's wife
 Louis de Funès (uncredited)

See also
No Exit (1962)

References

External links 
 
 Huis-clos (1954) at the Films de France

1954 films
French drama films
1950s French-language films
French black-and-white films
Films directed by Jacqueline Audry
French films based on plays
Lesbian-related films
Films scored by Joseph Kosma
1954 drama films
1950s French films